Deuces Wild is the thirty-fifth studio album by B.B. King released on November 4, 1997. Every song on the album features a second famous musician.

Track listing
"If You Love Me" (with Van Morrison) - 5:48
"The Thrill Is Gone" (with Tracy Chapman) - 5:00
"Rock Me Baby" (with Eric Clapton) - 6:38
"Please Send Me Someone to Love" (with Mick Hucknall) - 4:16
"Baby I Love You" (with Bonnie Raitt) - 4:00
"Ain't Nobody Home" (with D'Angelo) - 5:18
"Pauly's Birthday Boogie" (with Jools Holland) - 3:39
"There Must Be a Better World Somewhere" (with Dr. John) - 4:50
"Confessin' the Blues" (with Marty Stuart) - 4:32
"Hummingbird" (with Dionne Warwick) - 4:20
"Bring It Home to Me" (with Paul Carrack) - 3:10
"Paying the Cost to Be the Boss" (with The Rolling Stones) - 3:35
"Let the Good Times Roll" (with Zucchero) - 4:00
"Dangerous Mood" (with Joe Cocker) - 4:55
"Keep It Coming" (with Heavy D) - 3:57
"Cryin' Won't Help You Babe" (with David Gilmour & Paul Carrack) - 4:12
"Night Life" (with Willie Nelson) - 4:30

Tracks 7, 10, 11, 13: bonus tracks on the import edition (UK/Japan)

Personnel
B.B. King – vocals (except tracks 1, 7 and 11), guitar
Neil Hubbard – guitar (Tr. 1, 2, 4, 7, 11, 16)
Pino Palladino – bass guitar (Tr. 1, 3, 4, 5, 6, 7, 11, 13, 15, 16)
Jools Holland – piano (Tr. 1, 7, 11)
Andy Newmark – drums (Tr. 1, 4, 7, 11, 16)
Paul Carrack – Hammond B3 organ (Tr. 1, 2, 3, 4, 7, 11), keyboards (Tr. 1, 7, 16), piano (16), vocals (11, 16)
Van Morrison – vocals, harmonica (Tr. 1)
Tony Braunagel – drums (Tr. 2 & 10), percussion (Tr. 2)
Reggie McBride – bass guitar (Tr. 2 & 10)
Johnny Lee Schell – guitar (Tr. 2 & 10)
Lenny Castro – percussion (Tr. 2, 6, 8, 10, 11, 15)
Tommy Eyre – Wurlitzer piano (Tr. 2), Hammond organ (Tr. 9, 14, 17), piano (10), keyboards (8, 12)
Martin Tillman – cello (Tr. 2 & 10)
Miles Tackett – cello (Tr. 2)
Tracy Chapman – vocals (Tr. 2)
Paulinho da Costa – percussion (Tr. 3)
Eric Clapton – guitar, vocals (Tr. 3)
Paul Waller – programming (Tr. 3)
Simon Climie – programming (Tr. 3)
Chris Stainton – piano (Tr. 4, 14, 16), keyboards (Tr. 4)
Mick Hucknall – vocals (Tr. 4)
Steve Jordan – drums (Tr. 5, 6, 13 & 15)
Hugh McCracken – guitar (Tr. 5, 6, 13 & 15)
Leon Pendarvis - organ (Tr 5, 6, 13 & 15)
Jon Cleary - piano  (Tr. 5, 13 & 15), Wurlitzer piano (6)
Bonnie Raitt – guitar, vocals (Tr. 5)
D'Angelo – keyboards, vocals (Tr. 6)
Randy Jacobs – guitar (Tr. 8 & 17)
Bill Payne – keyboards (Tr. 8, 9 & 17)
Jim Keltner – drums (Tr. 8, 9 & 17)
James "Hutch" Hutchinson – bass guitar (Tr. 8, 9, 14 & 17)
Dr. John – vocals (Tr. 8)
Marty Stuart – guitar, vocals (Tr. 9)
Dionne Warwick – vocals (Tr. 10)
Zucchero – vocals (Tr. 13)
Joe Cocker – vocals (Tr. 14)
Kenny Aronoff – drums (Tr. 14)
Michael Landau – guitar (Tr. 14)
Dean Parks – guitar (Tr. 14)
C. J. Vanston – Hammond B3 organ (Tr. 14)
Heavy D – rap (Tr. 15)
David Gilmour – guitar (Tr. 16)
Mickey Raphael – harmonica (Tr. 17)
Willie Nelson - guitar, vocals (Tr. 17)

The Rolling Stones on track 12:

Mick Jagger – vocals, harmonica
Keith Richards – guitar
Ronnie Wood – guitar
Charlie Watts – drums
Darryl Jones – bass guitar

String section on tracks 1 & 4:
Andrea Byers – violin
Armen Garabedian – violin
Berj Garabedian – violin
Norman Hughes – violin
Tamara Hatwan – violin
Kenneth Yerke – violin
Bruce Dukov – violin
Sid Page – violin
Robert Becker – viola
Larry Colbert – cello
Dane Little – cello
Marston Smith – cello

French horn section on track 2:
Daniel P. Kelley – French horn
Yvonne S. Moriarty – French horn
Kurt Snyder – French horn

Horn section on tracks 2, 7, 10, 11, 12 & 13:
Darrell Leonard – trumpet, horn arrangements
Joe Sublett – tenor saxophone
Greg Smith – baritone saxophone (tracks 7 & 13 only)

Horn section on tracks 6 & 8:
Jamil Sharif – trumpet
Brian Murray – trumpet
Carl Blouin – baritone saxophone
Joe Saulsbury Jr. – tenor saxophone

Backing vocals on tracks 5, 10, 11 & 16:
Harry Bowens – background vocals
Terence Forsythe – background vocals
Vincent Bonham – background vocals

Charts

Certifications

References

1997 albums
B.B. King albums
Vocal–instrumental duet albums
MCA Records albums